Vladimir Alekseyevich Kirillin (– 29 January 1999) was a Soviet physicist specializing in energetics and thermophysics and a member of the Academy of Sciences of the Soviet Union, as well as a Soviet party official. 

After graduating from the Moscow Power Engineering Institute in 1936, Kirillin worked at the Kashira State Regional Electric Power Plant, at the Unifold Boiler Construction Bureau, and at the Moscow Power Engineering Institute, becoming its professor in 1952. During World War II he served in the navy. From 1954 to 1962 he took leading positions at the Soviet ministries of science and higher education. In 1963-1965 he served as vice-president of the Soviet Academy of Sciences, and in 1965 he was appointed as deputy chairman of the Council of Ministers of the USSR and chairman of the State Committee for Science and Technology (GKNT) of the Council of Ministers of the USSR. In 1966 Kirillin became a member of the Communist Party of the Soviet Union. He was a deputy to the Supreme Soviet of the Soviet Union at its sixth, seventh, and eighth meetings. He was awarded the Stalin Prize in 1951 and the Lenin Prize in 1959, as well as four Orders of Lenin and an Order of the Red Banner of Labour, among other medals.

Kirillin’s scientific research focused on the thermophysical properties of solids, liquid water and its vapor. He was also developing magnetohydrodynamic generators for the direct conversion of thermal energy into electric energy.

References

1913 births
1999 deaths
20th-century Russian physicists
Scientists from Moscow
Central Committee of the Communist Party of the Soviet Union members
Foreign Members of the Bulgarian Academy of Sciences
Full Members of the Russian Academy of Sciences
Full Members of the USSR Academy of Sciences
Moscow Power Engineering Institute alumni
Academic staff of Moscow Power Engineering Institute
Sixth convocation members of the Supreme Soviet of the Soviet Union
Seventh convocation members of the Supreme Soviet of the Soviet Union
Eighth convocation members of the Supreme Soviet of the Soviet Union
Ninth convocation members of the Supreme Soviet of the Soviet Union
Tenth convocation members of the Supreme Soviet of the Soviet Union
Stalin Prize winners
Lenin Prize winners
Recipients of the Order "For Merit to the Fatherland", 4th class
Recipients of the Order of Lenin
Recipients of the Order of the Red Banner of Labour
Recipients of the USSR State Prize
Russian memoirists
Russian physicists
Soviet memoirists
Soviet physicists
Burials at Novodevichy Cemetery